B. ehrenbergii may refer to:

 Barbula ehrenbergii, a Western Australian moss
 Bartlettina ehrenbergii, a flowering plant
 Brachistosternus ehrenbergii, a South American scorpion